The Brendan Grace Show is an Irish variety show presented by Brendan Grace. The studio-based show aired on Friday nights between 29 October and 10 December 1982.

Format
The Brendan Grace Show featured comedy routines and sketches by Brendan Grace as well as special celebrity guests.  The music was provided by special musical guests as well as the show's house band, Daddy Cool and the Lollipops. The dance group Gypsy made regular appearances throughout the series.

Programming

Series 1: 1982

Production
The Brendan Grace Show was broadcast live from Studio 1 in the RTÉ Television Centre at Donnybrook, Dublin 4. As RTÉ's biggest at the time, the studio held 120 audience members. There was no show broadcast on 26 November 1982 due to the general election.

References

1982 Irish television series debuts
1982 Irish television series endings
Irish variety television shows
RTÉ original programming